Paintsville Lake State Park is a park located just west of Paintsville, Kentucky in Johnson County. The park itself encompasses , while Paintsville Lake, its major feature, covers approximately  extending into parts of Morgan County.

The park contains thirty-two developed campsites, ten primitive campsites, a playground, four picnic shelters, a four lane launch ramp, an amphitheater, a restaurant, a marina, and a Kiwanis Trail, a National Recreation Trail. The park also contains the Mountain Homeplace, which is a replica of a small farming community in Eastern Kentucky between 1850 and 1900, and has an adjacent  wildlife management area.

Gallery

References

External links
Paintsville Lake State Park Kentucky Department of Parks
Paintsville Lake Facilities Map Kentucky Department of Parks
Paintsville Lake Area Interactive GIS Map Commonwealth of Kentucky
Mountain Homeplace

State parks of Kentucky
Protected areas of Johnson County, Kentucky
Protected areas of Morgan County, Kentucky
Protected areas established in 1986
1986 establishments in Kentucky